Jonatan Neftalí Díez-González (born 26 August 1984) is a Spanish footballer who plays for CF La Nucía as a central defender.

Club career
Born in Alicante, Valencian Community, Neftalí played youth football in his native region, mainly with Hércules CF and Alicante CF. He made his debuts as a professional with the latter club during the 2004–05 season, being sent off in both of his Segunda División B appearances, against CF Badalona and Levante UD B.

Neftalí continued competing in the third level in the following three years, being relegated with CD Alcalá and PD Santa Eulàlia. After the latter campaign he went on trial with Grasshopper Club Zürich from Switzerland, but nothing came of it and he continued playing with Santa Eulalia in Tercera División.

In 2009–10, Neftalí scored a career-best ten goals. Subsequently, Vejle Boldklub manager Mats Gren – a former assistant with Grasshoppers – declared interest in signing the player, and a two-year contract was signed in late May 2010. In his first season he only missed one match as his team finished in third position, being the first place outside of the Danish Superliga promotion zone.

In March 2012, Neftalí extended his link with Vejle Boldklub Kolding (the club was renamed in 2011, and returned to its original denomination two years later), with the new deal running until the summer of 2015.

References

External links

1984 births
Living people
Footballers from Alicante
Spanish footballers
Association football defenders
Segunda División B players
Tercera División players
Alicante CF footballers
CD Alcalá players
FC Jumilla players
CF La Nucía players
Danish 1st Division players
Vejle Boldklub Kolding players
Vejle Boldklub players
Úrvalsdeild karla (football) players
Spanish expatriate footballers
Expatriate men's footballers in Denmark
Expatriate footballers in Iceland
Spanish expatriate sportspeople in Denmark
Spanish expatriate sportspeople in Iceland